Dominican Spanish is Spanish as spoken in the Dominican Republic; and also among the Dominican diaspora, most of whom live in the United States, chiefly in New York City, New Jersey, Connecticut, Rhode Island, Massachusetts, Pennsylvania, and Florida.

Dominican Spanish, a Caribbean dialect of Spanish, is based on the Andalusian and Canarian Spanish dialects of southern Spain, and has influences from African languages, Taíno and other Arawakan languages. Speakers of Dominican Spanish may also use conservative words that in other varieties of Spanish could be considered archaisms. The variety spoken in the Cibao region is influenced by the 16th- and 17th-century Portuguese colonists in the Cibao valley, and shows a larger-than-national-average influence by the 18th-century Canarian settlers.

The Dominican Republic is part of a group of Latin American countries "where the [Spanish] language remains closer to its Castilian and Andalusian origins", not having "an enormous Indigenous influence" unlike "Mexico and Peru". The Africans "did not contributed with any distinctive feature" that can distinguish the 
Dominican Spanish from other Latin American Spanish dialects.

There is a great influence from Haitian Creole and African languages in the Spanish spoken by Haitians in the Dominican Republic, particularly in grammar and phonetics. However, second generation immigrants from Haiti use to speak very close to the Dominican standard speech, if not actually speaking it, assimilating into the mainstream speech.

History 
Most of the Spanish-speaking settlers came from Andalusia (southern Spain) and the Canary Islands. When they first arrived in what is now the Dominican Republic, the first native people they had contact with were the Arawak-speaking Taino people.

Spanish, just as in other Latin American countries, completely replaced the indigenous languages (Taíno, Macorix and Ciguayo) of the Dominican Republic to the point where they became entirely extinct, mainly due to the fact that the majority of the indigenous population quickly died out only a few years after European contact.

However, when the Spanish arrived, they found the flora and fauna of the island, as well as various cultural artifacts, very different from those of Spain, so many of the words used by the natives to name these things were conserved and assimilated, thereby enriching Spanish lexicon. Some of these words include: ají, anón, batata, barbacoa, bejuco, bija, caiman, canoa, caoba, conuco, guanábana, guayaba, hamaca, hobo (jobo), hutía, iguana, jagua, maní, papaya (lechosa), sabana, yuca.

Dominican Spanish also includes words indirectly borrowed from African languages via Portuguese, such as cachimbo, which was borrowed from the Portuguese word "cacimba", having the latter being borrowed from the Bantu "cazimba". Many of these African influences are quite distant and left a minor impact on modern day Dominican Spanish, and usually these words are also used in other Spanish-speaking countries as far-away as Argentina, therefore it is not just a phenomenon restricted to the Dominican Republic but common in the Latin American Spanish (compared to European Spanish). Dominican Spanish has also received some limited influence from Haitian Creole, due to the Haitian occupation of Santo Domingo and continuing cross-border contacts. Haitian influence is stronger in border regions. Haitian Creole and Samaná English have also influenced the speech of Samaná Province further adding to the African influence found in the dialect.

Phonology

Like most other Spanish dialects, Dominican Spanish features yeísmo: the sounds represented by ll (the palatal lateral ) and y (historically the palatal approximant ) have fused into one. That is, in the Dominican Republic (as in most of Latin America and Spain), se cayó "he fell down" is homophonous with se calló "he became silent / he shut up".
That is, caza ("hunt") is homophonous with casa ("house"). Seseo is common to nearly all of Hispanic America, the Canary Islands, and southern Spain.
Strong contraction in everyday speech is common, as in "voy a" into "vuá" or "voá", or "¿para adónde vas?" into "¿p'ónde va'?". Another example: "David 'tá 'co'ta'o", from "David está acostado" ("David is lying down / David is sleeping"), though vowel degemination is normal in most Spanish dialects, cf. Standard Peninsular "David est'acostado", normally pronounced with a single .
The fricative  has a tendency to disappear or to become a voiceless  or voiced glottal fricative , the latter before voiced consonants, at the end of syllables. The change may be realized only at the word level or it may also cross word boundaries. Aspiration or disappearance of syllable-final  is common to much of Hispanic America, the Canary Islands, and southern Spain. Syllable-final [s] is less frequently reduced in formal speech, like TV broadcasts.
Example 1: To say lo niño or los niño, instead of los niños
Example 2: To say lluvia ailada or lluvias ailada, instead of lluvias aisladas
 Syllable-initial  can occasionally be aspirated as well in rural parts of El Cibao. This occurs most often in the reflexive pronoun  and in  'yes'.
In some areas, speakers tend to drop the final r sound in verb infinitives. The elision is considered a feature of uneducated speakers in some places, but it is widespread in others, at least in rapid speech.
Syllable-final r tends to be changed in many words by an i sound in the Northerly Cibao and in El Seibo Province and by an l (L) in the Eastern and in the capital city (Santo Domingo): the verb correr (to run) is pronounced correi and correl respectively, and perdón (forgiveness) becomes peidón and peldón. Final  is also merged into  in El Cibao and El Seibo. This substitution with the i is delicately (almost mutely) present in Andalusian Spanish, and also the l use is prototypical, and more marked, in Puerto Rican Spanish. It is believed to be of Andalusian origin.
The "d" is silent in the common word-ending -ado. For example, the words casado (married) and lado (side, way) are pronounced as casao and lao in Dominican Spanish.
In a few parts of the country, an "el" at the end of a word is pronounced as "err." For example, Miguel may be pronounced as Miguer in Dominican Spanish, a feature shared with Andalusian Spanish and in contrast to Puerto Rican Spanish, where the reverse occurs, e.g. pronouncing the name Arturo (Arthur) as Alturo.
 Word-final  is typically velarized at the end of a phrase or before another word starting in a vowel. Final  may also be velarized word internally. In rural El Cibao, final  may also be completely elided, typically nasalizing the preceding vowel, but occasionally it can be dropped entirely with no trace of nasalization. That total elision is most common among children.
 The alveolar trill  and even the tap  can be replaced with an uvular trill among some rural speakers from El Cibao.

Other differences with Standard Spanish include adding the s erroneously, thus overcompensating the habit of omitting it.

Example 1:
standard: administraciones públicas [public administrations]
vernacular: aminitracione pública
hypercorrected: asministracione púsblica
Example 2:
standard: jaguar [jaguar]
vernacular: jagual / jaguai
hypercorrected: jasguar

The hypercorrected form is often part of a blatantly sarcastic mode of speech, commonly used for joking rather than everyday speech. Among rural children in El Cibao, s-insertion is still common, which calls into question its status as a hypercorrection since these children have little exposure to standard forms of speech. Word-internally, s-insertion is most common before voiceless stop consonants, especially , and almost never occurs before nasals. Rural residents of El Cibao frequently insert an s after function words, as in  'of everything'. This is typically before stop consonants but can occasionally be before vowels, as in  'of animals'. Some speakers also use final s-insertion as a prosodic boundary marker.

For example,  'Haiti' may be pronounced .

Grammar
Voseo is unknown in Dominican Spanish.

Both of those are associated with more marginalized sociolects.

Pedro Henríquez Ureña claims that, at least until 1940, the educated population of the Dominican Republic continued to use the future subjunctive verb forms. Educated Dominicans never used the conditional in place of the imperfect subjunctive, as in  'If I had seen', nor did they ever use the imperfect subjunctive instead of the conditional, as in  'then I would have said'. Clitic object pronouns could often be placed after a finite verb, especially in narration, as in  instead of the typical  'arrives and gets dressed quickly'.

Like in other Caribbean varieties of Spanish, explicit, redundant subject pronouns are frequent in Dominican Spanish. Pronominal  'one' may be frequently used, in cases where speakers of other varieties would use impersonal or reflexive  constructions. Personal subject pronouns can be used to refer to inanimate objects:  'She (the community) is big'.

Dominican Spanish allows for "preverbal placement of subjects with interrogatives and with non-finite clauses". In more normative speech, the subject would typically go after the verb instead. Some examples are:  'What do you guys want to eat?' and  'That's for Odalis to take it to Lari'.

Other prominent aspects of Dominican Spanish include focalizing  constructions, and clause-final negation and affirmation:

  'You had to come earlier (it was)'
  'French, I don't know if it's easy to learn'
  'Mom knew a lot'

Rural El Cibao 
In addition to these traits, the following has been found in rural speech in El Cibao, among people who are functionally illiterate, by :

This is likely due to the influence of the clitic , and analogy with standard forms such as  'call us'.
 Subjunctive forms used instead of the imperative, as in  'we're bringing five hundredweights of product', or  'something here that we call yagua'.
 Substitution of  'he/she/it has' for  'I have', for example,  'I gave them a beating for that'.
 As in many other dialects, impersonal  and  may show third person plural agreement. What's more peculiar is that they may also be conjugated in other persons as well:
  'It's been three months since it last rained'
  'There were some who knew'
  'It's been some time since I've gone over there'
  'There are few of us families in Los Compos'
  'There are two or three of us'
  and  can be used as adverbs without the  suffix. Also, when used as adjectives, they don't always agree with plural subjects:  'it's learned easily',  'they're very difficult'.
 Those same -final words may receive a plural interpretation:  'those are pens'.
  'well' may be used as a predicate adjective, as in  'they're good'.

Likely related to the frequent use of subject pronouns, in the Cibao region  'it/there' may be used as a dummy pronoun with "impersonal and meteorological verbs, unaccusative predicates, impersonal passives, and other constructions in which transitives are used intransitively":

  'There are people who learn it (English) well'
  'It's not raining here'
  'Haitians come here'
  'There's still a lot of time left'
  'Because if some people from outside arrive'
  'Haitians come here'
It's been suggested that  functions as a discourse marker.

 , instead of  'I'd like to be a teacher'
  for  'None of that's happened to me'
  for  'Although I'll need that'
  for  'The hummingbirds like coming to these flowers'

Cibaeños often drop the  should occur before a definite animate direct object:

  'Hearing Haitians'
  'To understand people from France'

They also use a unique pattern of cliticization:

  for  'We will have to give it to them'
  for  'Go sow it'

Vocabulary

Dominican vocabulary
As in every dialect, Dominican Spanish has numerous vocabulary differences from other forms of the language. The Dominican Academy of Letters (Academia Dominicana de la Lengua) published in November 2013 a dictionary of Dominican terms (Diccionario del español dominicano) containing close to 11,000 words and phrases peculiar to the Dominican dialect. Here are some examples:

A slightly pejorative slang expression also common around most of the Caribbean basin is vaina. The Castilian meanings are "sheath", "pod", "shell", "shell casing", and "hull" (of a plant). It is descended from the Latin word "vāgīna", which meant "sheath". 
In the Dominican Republic "vaina" is mainly a thing, a matter, or simply "stuff". For example, ¿Qué vaina es esa? means ¿Qué cosa es esa?, "What is that thing/stuff?".

Anglicisms—due to cultural and commercial influence from the United States and the American occupations of the Dominican Republic during 1916–1924 and 1965–1966—are extremely common in Dominican Spanish, more so than in any other Spanish variant except for Puerto Rican and perhaps Northern Mexican Spanish. A prime example of this is "vaguada", which is a corruption of the English "bad weather", though in Dominican Spanish the term has come to mean storm or torrential downpour, rather than a spot of unpleasant climate. Hence, a common Dominican expression: "Viene una vaguada", "here comes a vaguada", or "here comes a storm". Another excellent example of this is "boche", a corruption of the English "bull shit", though in Dominican Spanish the term has come to mean a reprimanding, fulmination, or harangue in general terms. Hence, a common Dominican expression: "Me echaron un boche", "they threw me a boche", or "they reprimanded me". Furthermore, is the Dominican Spanish word for SUV, "yipeta", "jeepeta", or rarely "gipeta". This term is a corruption of the American "Jeep", which was the primary mode of transport for the GIs throughout the country during the occupation in the 1960s. Dominican license plates for SUVs are marked with a "G" for "gipeta", a variant of, and pronounced like, "yipeta", before their serial number. The word "tichel", from "T-shirt", also refers to a rugby shirt, association football jersey, or undershirt, and similarly, "corn flakes" and its variant "con fléi" can refer to any breakfast cereal, in Dominican Spanish, be it puffed corn, bran flakes, or puffed wheat. The borrowing "polo shirt" is frequently pronounced polo ché.

Another phenomenon related to Anglicisms is the usage of brand names as common names for certain objects. For example, "Gillette" and its derivative yilé refer to any razor, and while the machete is known as machete, this being originally a Spanish word, it is sometimes referred to as a "colín", derived from "Collins & Co.", name of a former Connecticut toolmaker.

Similarities in Spanish dialects
Below are different vocabulary words to demonstrate the similarities between the dialects of the Dominican Republic and other Caribbean countries, including Puerto Rico, Cuba, Colombia, Venezuela, and Panama. The dialects of Andalusia and the Canary Islands, two regions of Spain that have been highly influential on the dialects of these countries, are also included.

Some words and names borrowed from Arawakan

References
Footnotes

Sources

Other links

Dominican Spanish Bilingual Dictionary English-Spanish
Learn Dominican Spanish
Pérez Guerra, Irene: "El arcaismo del español dominicano"
Dominican Spanish Lessons
Everyculture-Culture of Dominican Republic

Caribbean Spanish
Spanish